Assinia pumilio is a species of beetle in the family Cerambycidae. It was described by Kolbe in 1893.

References

Apomecynini
Beetles described in 1893